James Donell "Scoonie" Penn (born January 9, 1977) is an American professional basketball coach and former player who is an assistant coach for the Memphis Grizzlies of the National Basketball Association (NBA). He was a point guard during his playing career that was spent primarily in Europe. Although Penn was selected in the 2000 NBA Draft by the Atlanta Hawks with the 57th overall pick, he never played a single game in the NBA, joining 7 other players from his draft class that never played in the league.

High school
Penn played high school basketball at Salem High School in Salem, Massachusetts. He led the team to a state championship in 1995.

College career
After high school, Penn played college basketball at Boston College, before transferring to Ohio State University, where he teamed up to form a dominant back court with the future Milwaukee Bucks' shooting guard Michael Redd.

Professional career 
After college, Penn left the United States to play in Europe. He made his big splash with the Adriatic League club Crvena zvezda (Red Star Belgrade). He had a great 2002–03 season with Crvena zvezda. The fans loved him. He was the leader of the team, and that was the best season in his career.

Penn left Red Star the following season, and played in the 2005–06 season for Cibona Zagreb. In the 2006–07 season, he was a member of the Greek League club Olympiacos. He then moved to the Turkish Super League club Efes Pilsen, for the 2007–08 season, followed by the Ukrainian Super League club Kyiv, in the 2008–09 season.

At the beginning of the 2009–10 season, Penn made the move to the Italian League, to play with Virtus Bologna. On New Years Day, 2010, it was announced by Greek powerhouse Olympiacos, that Penn would return to the club, to replace Von Wafer, who had been released, due to his inability to adapt to the European game. In October 2010, he signed with Prima Veroli, which was playing in the Italian Second Division at the time.

National team career
As a member of Team USA, Penn won a gold medal at the 1999 Palma Summer Universiade.

Coaching career
After Penn retired from playing professional basketball, he became the director of player development for the Ohio State basketball program. In 2019, he accepted a position working as an assistant coach with the NBA's Memphis Grizzlies.

Awards and accomplishments 
College:
1995–96 Big East Conference Rookie of the Year, First Team All-Big East Conference member.
1996–97 First Team All-Big East Conference. Big East Conference tournament championship winner (MVP).
1998–99 Big Ten Conference Co-Player of the Year.
1998–99 Led Ohio State to the NCAA Final Four.
1999–00 Frances Pomeroy Naismith Award, as the nation's top senior under 6'0" (1.83 m) tall.
Selected Third Team All-America, and First Team All-Big Ten Conference, in both his junior season and senior season. Ended his career at Ohio State University, as the college's all-time leader in three-point field goals made.

References

External links
Euroleague.net Profile
FIBA Europe Profile
Italian League Profile 
Interview with Scoonie Penn from September 2003
NBDL stats

1977 births
Living people
20th-century African-American sportspeople
21st-century African-American sportspeople
ABA League players
African-American basketball coaches
African-American basketball players
All-American college men's basketball players
American expatriate basketball people in Croatia
American expatriate basketball people in Greece
American expatriate basketball people in Italy
American expatriate basketball people in Serbia
American expatriate basketball people in Turkey
American expatriate basketball people in Ukraine
American men's basketball coaches
American men's basketball players
Anadolu Efes S.K. players
Asheville Altitude players
Atlanta Hawks draft picks
Basketball players from New York (state)
BC Kyiv players
Boston College Eagles men's basketball players
KK Cibona players
KK Crvena zvezda players
Makedonikos B.C. players
Medalists at the 1999 Summer Universiade
Memphis Grizzlies assistant coaches
Ohio State Buckeyes men's basketball players
Olympiacos B.C. players
Pallacanestro Virtus Roma players
Point guards
Salem High School (Massachusetts) alumni
Sportspeople from Salem, Massachusetts
Sportspeople from Yonkers, New York
Universiade gold medalists for the United States
Universiade medalists in basketball
Veroli Basket players
Victoria Libertas Pallacanestro players
Virtus Bologna players